The Renault Latitude is an executive car produced by the French automaker Renault, and announced in June 2010. It debuted at the Moscow International Automobile Salon, at the end of August 2010. The Latitude served as the company's flagship vehicle, before it was replaced in 2016 by the Renault Talisman.

Design 
The Latitude is a four-door saloon based on the Renault–Nissan D platform, and already developed as the third generation (L43) Renault Samsung SM5. The Latitude was facelifted for 2015, with a new rear fascia.

Marketing 
The Latitude is the successor to the Renault Vel Satis, which went out of production in August 2009. Sales of Renault Latitude began in Asia, Australia and Eastern Europe in the autumn of 2010. In Mexico, it was launched during the first quarter of 2011 as the Renault Safrane.

The European version of the Latitude, with full details of the model's equipment lists and engines ranges, was shown at the 2010 Paris Motor Show, and sales in Western Europe began in the beginning of 2011, but not in the United Kingdom.

The Latitude is used as a taxi in Singapore and Macau with those sedans being made by Renault Samsung Motors and badged as Renault vehicles.

The vehicle was replaced alongside the Laguna by the Talisman, announced during a 2015 press conference in France.

Engines

Gallery

References

External links 
 Renault Latitude at Renault.com

Latitude
Executive cars
Sedans
Euro NCAP large family cars
Front-wheel-drive vehicles
Cars introduced in 2010